The Veil may refer to:

 The Veil (American TV series), a 1958 American horror/supernatural anthology television series hosted by Boris Karloff
 The Veil (2016 film), a 2016 American supernatural horror film
 The Veil (2017 film), a 2017 American post-apocalyptic film
 The Veil (South Korean TV series), a 2021 South Korean television series

See also
Veil (disambiguation)